Ulrich Hensel (born 1946) is a German visual artist known for his large format colour photographs of construction sites.

Education 

He was born in Düsseldorf in 1946 and studied psychology, art and film. Ulrich Hensel did a number of different series of works (e.g. Middle East and North Africa, 1967-1975, India, 1981-1990, local deities in North and in South India, 1995-1997) but since 1991 he has been focusing on images of construction sites.

Career and style 

While not being formally associated with the Düsseldorf School of Photography the serial character of Ulrich Hensel's images and his similarly methodical approach suggests certain parallels to the school of Bernd and Hilla Becher. Andreas Gursky, with whom for some time he shared a flat, is said to be a fan of his work. Gurskys famous image Gasherd from 1980 was shot in their flat. However, Hensel's oeuvre is viewed as occupying a unique place among the photographic art to come out of Germany. 

For nearly two decades, Ulrich Hensel has been working almost obsessively focussing on one single subject: construction sites. His images are often abstract and sometimes minimalist – "grids, dots, fastenings and iron grilles extend across the pictures in rigorous formations defined by the functions of the objects shown" – and inevitably create associations with the geometric abstract art of Kazimir Malevich and Piet Mondrian. The technical world of rebars, Lintels, insulation, wall markings, cladding and steel bars in his works are the metaphors to works from Mark Rothko, Donald Judd as well as Cy Twombly. Like Leonardo da Vinci recognized a world from drawings in a weathered wall, Ulrich Hensel loves to look at construction sites. 

In contrast to Andreas Gursky, who in recent years has been heavily relying on computers to edit and enhance his pictures, Hensel is concerned with authenticity and avoids digital manipulations. His large-format photographs are described as "unobtrusive and complex at the same time".

Selected exhibitions 
 2020 In-Between Worlds. Kunstmuseum Wolfsburg, Wolfsburg, Germany.
 2012  Exhibition project together with Andreas Gursky, Lehmbruck Museum, Duisburg, Germany.
 2012	State of the Art Photography. NRW Forum, Düsseldorf, Germany.
 2011	Die Entdeckung der Wirklichkeit – Photographie an der Kunstakademie Düsseldorf von 1970 bis Heute. Akademie-Galerie. Düsseldorf, Germany.
 2007	Galerie Sprüth Magers, Projektraum, Munich, Germany.
 2002	Galerie Thomas Taubert, Düsseldorf, Germany.

Art market 

Most of Hensel's photos come in editions of six with two artist's proof. He is represented by Sprüth Magers Munich Berlin London in Europe.

References

External links 

 Works of Ulrich Hensel on his homepage
 Works from Ulrich Hensel at Martin Leyer-Pritzkow
 Literature about and from the artist in the German National Library

1946 births
Artists from Düsseldorf
Photographers from North Rhine-Westphalia
German contemporary artists
Living people